Gjelhøi is a mountain in Skjåk Municipality in Innlandet county, Norway. The mountain is surrounded by several other notable mountains including Hestdalshøgdi and Låven to the northeast, Hestbrepiggene to the southeast, Holåtindan to the southwest, and Tundradalskyrkja to the west. The Holåbreen glacier lies between this mountain and the nearby Holåtindan.

See also
List of mountains of Norway

References

Skjåk
Mountains of Innlandet
One-thousanders of Norway